Pilling is a village and civil parish in Lancashire, England. It can also refer to:

 Textile pilling, a surface defect of textiles characterized by small balls of fibres that form on a piece of cloth
 Pilling's Pond, privately owned urban waterfowl reserve and breeding ground in Licton Springs, Seattle, Washington

People
 Andy Pilling (born 1969), English footballer
 Ann Pilling (born 1944), English author and poet
 Barney Pilling, British television and film editor
 Clarence Pilling, discoverer of Pilling Figurines, a set of eleven clay figurines made by the Fremont culture
 Dick Pilling (1855–1891), English cricketer
 Donald L. Pilling (1943–2008), four-star United States Navy admiral
 Doral Pilling (1906–1982), Canadian athlete
 Harry Pilling (1943–2012), English cricketer
 James Pilling (1846–1895), American ethnologist
 Jonas Pilling (1855–1926), British priest
 Joseph Pilling (born 1945), British civil servant
 Mary Pilling (born 1938), English cricketer